Maxwell Mlilo (1960–2006) born in Mqanduli, was a South African actor who acted as Ngconde, Tshawe's relative in Emzini Wezinsizwa and also acted in dramas in Tshatsha.

References

1960 births
2006 deaths
South African male television actors